Dolgoch can refer to:
Dolgoch railway station, a station on the preserved Talyllyn Railway, Wales
Dolgoch (locomotive), a preserved steam locomotive on the Talyllyn Railway
Dolgoch Falls, a series of waterfalls near Tywyn in Mid Wales
Dolgoch quarry, Gwynedd, a former slate quarry in Mid Wales